(May 20, 1980 in Edogawa, Tokyo – August 9, 2006 in Tokyo) was a Japanese shot putter. Her personal best throw is 18.22 metres, achieved in April 2004 in Hamamatsu. This is the current Japanese record.

She won the silver medal at the 2000 Asian Championships and the bronze medal at the 2003 Asian Championships. In addition she competed at the 2003 World Championships and the 2004 Olympic Games without reaching the final round. Mori died of appendix cancer on August 9, 2006, aged 26.

International competitions

References

sports-reference

1980 births
2006 deaths
People from Edogawa, Tokyo
Sportspeople from Tokyo Metropolis
Japanese female shot putters
Olympic female shot putters
Olympic athletes of Japan
Athletes (track and field) at the 2004 Summer Olympics
Asian Games competitors for Japan
Athletes (track and field) at the 2002 Asian Games
World Athletics Championships athletes for Japan
Japan Championships in Athletics winners
Deaths from cancer in Japan
Athletes from Tokyo
21st-century Japanese women